The Aue, also known as the Bückeburger Aue, is an approximately  long, eastern tributary of the river Weser in the Schaumburg District of Lower Saxony, and in the Minden-Lübbecke District of North Rhine-Westphalia. It flows into the Weser near Petershagen.

See also
List of rivers of Lower Saxony
List of rivers of North Rhine-Westphalia

References

Rivers of Lower Saxony
Rivers of North Rhine-Westphalia
Rivers of Germany